Prabhat Khabar is a Hindi language newspaper published daily in Jharkhand, Bihar and West Bengal. The newspaper is circulated in several states in India, including Bihar, Jharkhand, West Bengal and some parts of Orissa. It was founded in August 1984 in Ranchi, the capital of Jharkhand. The newspaper is notable for reporting social issues and revealing scams, such as the Fodder Scam. The newspaper began reporting the Fodder Scam in 1992. Despite receiving threats, the newspaper wrote 70 reports on the scam and had four or five reporters reporting the story.

Notable staff
Feroze Varun Gandhi

References

External links
 Official website 
 Official epaper
 Practising Journalism: Values, Constraints, Implications edited by Nalini Rajan

Daily newspapers published in India
Hindi-language newspapers
Mass media in Jharkhand
Newspapers published in Patna
Newspapers published in Gaya, India
Newspapers published in Muzaffarpur
Newspapers published in Bhagalpur
Newspapers published in Aurangabad, Bihar
Publications established in 1984
1984 establishments in Bihar